Ismail Fatah Al-Turk ("Ismail Fatah") (1934 or 1938–2004) was an Iraqi painter and sculptor born in Basra, Iraq, noted for his abstract art, monumental sculpture and public works and as part of the Baghdad Modern Art Group, which fostered a sense of national identity. His monument, al-Shaeed is the most iconic public monument in Baghdad.

Life and career
Al-Turk was born in Basra in 1934. He graduated from  the Baghdad Institute of Fine Arts in 1956 with a Bachelor of Painting and in 1958 with a Bachelor of Sculpture. and received a Master's degree in fine art from the Accademia di Belle Arti di Roma in 1962. While in Rome, he also studied ceramics at San Giacomo.

He was very active in Baghdad's arts culture, joining a number of art groups including the Baghdad Modern Art Group (1957) and the al-Zawiya group, both groups were concerned with using art to reassert a sense of national identity by integrating Iraq's artistic heritage with international trends.

Fatah taught sculpture at the Baghdad Institute of Fine Arts and ceramics at the Academy of Fine Arts at the University of Baghdad. In 1986, he was the Chairman of the Iraqi Association of Plastic Arts.

Fatah executed a number of murals and sculptures for public display in Baghdad. Many of these pay homage to notable Iraqi poets, both current and historical; including bronze statues of  Maaruf al-Risafi, an Iraqi nationalist poet active in the 1940s; the Abbasid poet Abu Nuwas and the Abbasid painter al-Wasiti. He held six exhibitions for sculpture and five exhibitions for paintings in Rome, Baghdad and Beirut. He was the winner of first prize for Arab artists in Italy.

The most well-known of his sculptures is the turquoise blue split dome of the Al-Shaheed Monument (Martyrs' Monument), in Palestine Street, Baghdad, and constructed between 1981 and 1983. Shaheed consists of a circular platform floating on top of an underground museum, and over which stands a split dome, 40 metres in height, clad in blue tile. He carried through all the design stages, along with a group of Iraqi architects, known as the Baghdad Architecture Group. The completed monument cost half a million dollars ($US). At its centre is a twisted metal flag pole and a spring of water to symbolise the blood of the fallen. Its aim was to commemorate the Iraqi dead as a result of the Iran-Iraq war.

On the subject of the design for Shaheed, Al-Turk made the following comments:

While living and working in United Arab Emirates, Fatah contracted cancer. He returned to Baghdad where he died 21 July 2004.

Work
Fatah's most well known work is  Shaheed (also known as the Matyrs Monument) built as a tribute to those who fell in battle defending Iraq during the Second Qadisiya (Iran-Iraq war). The Art in America magazine rated Shaheed as the most beautiful design in the Middle East. However, he also produced paintings in oil such as Ashtar, a mixed media work on paper now in the Jordanian National Gallery of Fine Arts.

List of notable public works
 Ancient Arabic Medicine, Baghdad, Bronze and Marble, 8 × 2 metres, 1982
 Tigris and Euphrates, Haifa Street, Baghdad, 5 metres, 1982
 Two Figures, bronze sculpture, 360 X 180 cm, 1967
 Lawyer's Union Facade,  1967
 Abu Nuwas, sculpture, now in Abu Nuwas Street, Baghdad, 1972
 Monuments to Iraqi Poets - al-Waisati (National Arts Centre), 1972; al-Farabi (Zawra Park); Abu Nawas, Abou Nawas Street, 1972; Ma’arouf al-Rasfi, and al-Kazimi, al Kazimiya, Baghdad, 1973; (all in bronze)
 Al Shaheed Monument, (also known as the Matyrs Monument), 1981–1983 in Palestine Street, Baghdad
 Conference Palace, 1983
 The Guardian of the Fertile Crescent,  2001–2010, now in the Mathaf: Arab Museum of Modern Art in Doha, Qatar  
 Maaruf al-Risafi (after the Iraqi poet of the same name) Al-Risafi roundabout, Baghdad

See also
 Iraqi art
 Islamic art
 List of Iraqi artists

References

External links
 

2004 deaths
1934 births
Abstract sculptors
Iraqi contemporary artists
Iraqi sculptors
People from Basra
Deaths from cancer in Iraq